Apostenus is a genus of liocranid sac spiders that was first described by Niklas Westring in 1851.

Species
 it contains thirteen species, found in Europe, Africa, Canada, the United States, and Karakorum:
Apostenus algericus Bosmans, 1999 – Algeria
Apostenus annulipedes Wunderlich, 1987 – Canary Is.
Apostenus annulipes Caporiacco, 1935 – Karakorum
Apostenus californicus Ubick & Vetter, 2005 – USA
Apostenus crespoi Lissner, 2017 – Portugal
Apostenus ducati Bennett, Copley & Copley, 2013 – USA, Canada
Apostenus fuscus Westring, 1851 (type) – Europe
Apostenus gomerensis Wunderlich, 1992 – Canary Is.
Apostenus grancanariensis Wunderlich, 1992 – Canary Is.
Apostenus humilis Simon, 1932 – Portugal, Spain, France
Apostenus maroccanus Bosmans, 1999 – Morocco
Apostenus ochraceus Hadjissarantos, 1940 – Greece
Apostenus palmensis Wunderlich, 1992 – Canary Is.

See also
 List of Liocranidae species

References

Araneomorphae genera
Liocranidae
Spiders of Africa
Spiders of North America